Matthew Rowlinson (born 1956) is a Canadian scholar and political candidate. He is professor and former chair of graduate studies in English at the University of Western Ontario. Rowlinson is known for his research on the relationship between literature and economics.

He has run as a candidate for Canada's federal parliament as a NDP candidate in London, Ontario in 2015.

Books
 Real Money and Romanticism, Cambridge University Press, 2010
 Tennyson’s Fixations: Psychoanalysis and the Topics of the Early Poetry, University Press of Virginia, 1994

References

External links
Rowlinson at the University of Western Ontario

Living people
1956 births
Canadian academics of English literature
New Democratic Party candidates for the Canadian House of Commons
Academic staff of the University of Western Ontario
Cornell University alumni
University of Toronto alumni
Ontario candidates for Member of Parliament